Cárdenas is the second-largest city in the state of Tabasco, in southeastern Mexico. It lies in the northwestern part of the state, on the Gulf of Mexico coast, east of the city of Coatzacoalcos, Veracruz. The city is the municipal seat of Cárdenas Municipality. At the census of 2005 the city had a population of 79,875 inhabitants, while the municipality had 219,563 inhabitants. There are numerous smaller communities in the municipality, but the largest are Sánchez Magallanes and Campo Magallanes. The area of the municipality is 2,112 km² (815.45 sq mi).

Climate

Education
Universidad Popular de la Chontalpa

References
Link to tables of population data from Census of 2005 INEGI: Instituto Nacional de Estadística, Geografía e Informática
Tabasco Enciclopedia de los Municipios de México

External links
Ayuntamiento de Cárdenas Official website

Populated places in Tabasco